The speckled snake eel (Xyrias multiserialis) is an eel in the family Ophichthidae (worm/snake eels). It was described by John Roxborough Norman in 1939, originally under the genus Ophichthus. It is a marine, tropical eel which is known from the western Indian Ocean, including the Gulf of Aden and Somalia.

References

Ophichthidae
Fish described in 1939